The Warriors is an eight-part Australian television comedy-drama series that premiered on ABC on 12 April 2017, created by Tony Briggs and Robert Connolly.

Plot
The series explores the elite world of professional sport through the eyes of recruits and established players living in a share house.

Cast

Main 
 Gordan Churchill as Maki Birrawuy, the number one draft pick
 Reece Milne as Doc Shepherd, the team-captain
 Nelson Baker as Zane Phillips
 Ben Knight as Scottie Watson
 John Howard as Bill Shepherd, club president and Doc's father
 Vince Colosimo as Coach Mark "Spinner" Spinotti
 Lisa McCune as Deb Van Exel, communications manager

Recurring 
 Kaden Hartcher as Meat
 Jeff Gobbels as Anchor
 Dan Haberfield as Boydy

Guest 
 Peter Bedford as himself
 Nicky Winmar as himself
 Kate Lister as Jessica

Production
The eight-part series is created by Tony Briggs and Robert Connolly. It explores the elite world of professional sport through the eyes of recruits and established players living in a share house.

The series is written by Jon Bell, Tony Briggs and Tracey Rigney. It is directed by Adrian Russell Wills, Beck Cole, Steven McGregor and Catriona McKenzie. It is produced by Arenamedia with John Harvey.

Release
The series premiered on ABC on 12 April 2017.

Episodes

References

External links 
 
 

Australian comedy television series
Australian drama television series
2017 Australian television series debuts
2017 Australian television series endings
English-language television shows
Television shows set in Victoria (Australia)
Australian Broadcasting Corporation original programming